Stavros Rigas, also known by his nom de guerre Kapetan Kavodoros was an officer of the Hellenic Army who participated in the Macedonian Struggle and was killed in action in the Greco-Turkish War (1919–1922).

Biography
He was born in Agios Dimitrios, on the island of Euboea. After attending Hebron Academy, he joined the Greek Struggle for Macedonia in 1905, entering with his detachment the Giannitsa Lake under the leadership of Kostantinos Boukouvalas. Along with Boukouvalas and Anagnostakos he managed to occupy crucial positions in the marshes of the Giannitsa Lake and create small bases in known as Tsekri, Ali and Lakka. His nom de guerre, kapetan ("captain, chief") Kavodoros, referenced Cape Cavo D'Oro near his native village.

In November 1905 following the withdrawal of Konstantinos Boukouvalas due to sickness, he replaced him as the leader of the struggle in Giannitsa marshes. Later he was joined by officer Michael Anagnostakos. In April 1906 the two leaders were reinforced by Panagiotis Papatzaneteas and Ioannis Sakelaropoulos

Stavros Rigas survived the Greek Struggle for Macedonia and participated in the Greco-Turkish War of 1919–22, where he fell in 1921.

References

Year of birth missing
1921 deaths
People from Euboea (regional unit)
Eastern Orthodox Christians from Greece
People of the Macedonian Struggle
Greek military personnel of the Greco-Turkish War (1919–1922)
Greek military personnel killed in action